Socket S1 is the CPU socket type used by AMD for their Turion 64, Athlon 64 Mobile, Phenom II Mobile and later Sempron processors, which debuted with the dual-core Turion 64 X2 CPUs on May 17, 2006.

Technical specifications

Socket S1 is a 638 pin, low profile, ZIF, 1.27mm pitch socket. It replaces the existing Socket 754 in the mobile computing segment (e.g. laptops).

Socket S1 CPUs can include support for dual-channel DDR2 SDRAM, dual-core mobile CPUs, and virtualization technology, and compete with the mobile Intel Core 2 processor series.

Socket S1 revisions
Different generations of processors used variant pinouts of the S1 socket; processors were not necessarily compatible with a socket even if they fit mechanically.
 Socket S1g1 or just S1
 Platforms: Kite and Kite Refresh
 CPUs: K8 core, HyperTransport 1.0, DDR2 memory
 Socket S1g2
 Platforms: Puma and Yukon
 CPUs: K8 Revision G core, HyperTransport 3.0, DDR2 memory
 Added:
 Split-power planes and linked power management support
 Support for possible low voltage processors
 Socket S1g3
 Platforms: Tigris 
 CPUs: K10.5 core, HyperTransport 3.0, DDR2 memory
 Socket S1g4
 Platforms: Danube
 CPUs: K10.5 core, HyperTransport 3.0, DDR3 memory

See also
 List of AMD microprocessors

References

External links
 AMD Preps to Switch to Socket S1, Socket M2, Socket F
 https://www.amd.com/system/files/TechDocs/31839.pdf (low profile socket S1 design specs)

AMD mobile sockets